Be There is the fourth single by B'z, released on May 25, 1990. The song initially peaked at #7 at Oricon Charts in 1990, and later peaked at #3 in 2003 during its re-release. It was the band's first song recorded specifically as a single not connected with any album. The song appears on 1998's Best "Pleasure" and 2008's Best "Ultra" Pleasure compilations. To date, it has sold over 348,000 copies.

Track listing
Be There

Certifications

References

1990 singles
B'z songs
Songs written by Tak Matsumoto
Songs written by Koshi Inaba
1990 songs
BMG Japan singles